Celaenorrhinus is a genus of skipper butterflies which are commonly termed sprites. An alternate name is flats, for their habit of holding their wings flat when resting, but this is also used for related genera. They are the type genus of tribe Celaenorrhinini.

Celaenorrhinus species are found in most tropical regions. However, rather than a monophyletic genus the group appears to be a paraphyletic assemblage, and will probably be split up in the future.

Species
The following species are recognised in the genus Celaenorrhinus and are split into three large species groups:
Africa species group
 
Celaenorrhinus ambra Evans, 1937
Celaenorrhinus ankasa Larsen & Miller, 2005
Celaenorrhinus aureus Collins & Larsen, 2005
Celaenorrhinus bakolo Miller, 1964
Celaenorrhinus beni Bethune-Baker, 1908
Celaenorrhinus bettoni Butler, 1902
Celaenorrhinus boadicea (Hewitson, 1877)
Celaenorrhinus chrysoglossa (Mabille, 1891)
Celaenorrhinus cordeironis Kielland, 1992
Celaenorrhinus dargei Berger, 1976
Celaenorrhinus galenus (Fabricius, 1793)
Celaenorrhinus handmani Collins & Congdon, 1998
Celaenorrhinus hecqui Berger, 1976
Celaenorrhinus homeyeri (Plötz, 1880)
Celaenorrhinus humbloti (Mabille, 1884)
Celaenorrhinus illustris (Mabille, 1891)
Celaenorrhinus illustroides Miller, 1971
Celaenorrhinus intermixtus Aurivillius, 1896
Celaenorrhinus kasai Evans, 1956
Celaenorrhinus kimboza Evans, 1949
Celaenorrhinus kivuensis Joicey & Talbot, 1921
Celaenorrhinus leona Berger, 1975
Celaenorrhinus lourentis de Jong, 1976
Celaenorrhinus macrostictus Holland, 1893
Celaenorrhinus meditrina (Hewitson, 1877)
Celaenorrhinus milleri Collins & Larsen, 2003
Celaenorrhinus nigropunctata Bethune-Baker, 1908
Celaenorrhinus nimba Collins & Larsen, 2000
Celaenorrhinus ovalis Evans, 1937
Celaenorrhinus perlustris Rebel, 1914
Celaenorrhinus plagiatus Berger, 1976
Celaenorrhinus proxima (Mabille, 1877)
Celaenorrhinus rubeho Kielland, 1990
Celaenorrhinus sagamase Collins & Larsen, 2005
Celaenorrhinus sanjeensis Kielland, 1990
Celaenorrhinus selysi Berger, 1955
Celaenorrhinus suzannae Berger, 1976
Celaenorrhinus toro Evans, 1937
Celaenorrhinus uluguru Kielland, 1990
Celaenorrhinus zanqua Evans, 1937

Asia species group
 
Celaenorrhinus aspersa Leech, 1891
Celaenorrhinus maculosa (C. & R. Felder, [1867])
Celaenorrhinus inexspectus Devyatkin, 2000
Celaenorrhinus phuongi Devyatkin, 2001
Celaenorrhinus incestus Devyatkin, 2000
Celaenorrhinus major Hsu, 1990
Celaenorrhinus kuznetsovi Devyatkin, 2000
Celaenorrhinus yaojiani Huang & Wu, 2003
Celaenorrhinus oscula Evans, 1949
Celaenorrhinus consanguinea Leech, 1891
Celaenorrhinus ratna Fruhstorfer, 1909
Celaenorrhinus pulomaya (Moore, [1866])
Celaenorrhinus horishanus Shirôzu, 1963
Celaenorrhinus pero de Nicéville, 1889
Celaenorrhinus choui Gu, 1994
Celaenorrhinus ruficornis (Mabille, 1878)
Celaenorrhinus ambareesa (Moore, [1866])
Celaenorrhinus spilothyrus (Felder, 1868)
Celaenorrhinus sumitra (Moore, [1866])
Celaenorrhinus pyrrha de Nicéville, 1889
Celaenorrhinus pahangensis Naylor, 1962
Celaenorrhinus leucocera (Kollar, [1844])
Celaenorrhinus putra (Moore, [1866])
Celaenorrhinus munda Moore, 1884
Celaenorrhinus nigricans (de Nicéville, 1885)
Celaenorrhinus asmara (Butler, [1879])
Celaenorrhinus inaequalis Elwes & Edwards, 1897
Celaenorrhinus ficulnea (Hewitson, 1868)
Celaenorrhinus ladana (Butler, 1870)
Celaenorrhinus patula de Nicéville, 1889
Celaenorrhinus tibetana (Mabille, 1876)
Celaenorrhinus andamanica (Wood-Mason & de Nicéville, 1881)
Celaenorrhinus badia (Hewitson, 1877)
Celaenorrhinus dhanada Moore, [1866]
Celaenorrhinus bazilanus (Fruhstorfer, 1909)
Celaenorrhinus entellus (Hewitson, 1867)
Celaenorrhinus flavocincta (de Nicéville, 1887)
Celaenorrhinus halconis de Jong & Treadaway, 1993
Celaenorrhinus kiku Hering, 1918
Celaenorrhinus kurosawai Shirôzu, 1963
Celaenorrhinus morena Evans, 1949
Celaenorrhinus patuloides de Jong, 1981
Celaenorrhinus plagifera de Nicéville, 1889
Celaenorrhinus saturatus Elwes & Edwards, 1897
Celaenorrhinus toxopei de Jong, 1981
Celaenorrhinus treadawayi de Jong, 1981
Celaenorrhinus zea Swinhoe, 1909

America species group
 
Celaenorrhinus aegiochus (Hewitson, 1876)
Celaenorrhinus anchialus (Mabille, 1878)
Celaenorrhinus approximatus Williams & Bell, 1940
Celaenorrhinus astrigera (Butler, 1877)
Celaenorrhinus autochton Steinhauser & Austin, 1996
Celaenorrhinus bifurcus Bell, 1934
Celaenorrhinus cynapes (Hewitson, 1870)
Celaenorrhinus disjunctus Bell, 1940
Celaenorrhinus eligius (Stoll, [1781])
Celaenorrhinus fritzgaertneri (Bailey, 1880)
Celaenorrhinus jao (Mabille, 1889)
Celaenorrhinus monartus (Plötz, 1884)
Celaenorrhinus orneates Austin, 1996
Celaenorrhinus par Steinhauser & Austin, 1996
Celaenorrhinus savia (Evans, 1952)
Celaenorrhinus shema (Hewitson, 1877)
Celaenorrhinus similis Hayward, 1933
Celaenorrhinus songoensis Draudt, 1922
Celaenorrhinus stallingsi Freeman, 1946
Celaenorrhinus stola Evans, 1952
Celaenorrhinus suthina (Hewitson, 1877)
Celaenorrhinus syllius (C. & R. Felder, 1862)
Celaenorrhinus tritonae (Weeks, 1901)
Celaenorrhinus vagra Evans, 1952

Former species
Celaenorrhinus aurivittata (Moore, 1878) - transferred to Aurivittia aurivittata (Moore, 1878)
Celaenorrhinus mokeezi (Wallengren, 1857) - transferred to Apallaga mokeezi (Wallengren, 1857)
Celaenorrhinus pooanus Aurivillius, 1910 - transferred to Apallaga pooanus (Aurivillius, 1910)
Celaenorrhinus rutilans (Mabille, 1877) - transferred to Apallaga rutilans (Mabille, 1877)
Celaenorrhinus vietnamicus Devyatkin, 1998 - transferred to Aurivittia vietnamicus (Devyatkin, 1998)

Genus characteristics

The following is a description of the genus from an old work and may not account for more recent taxonomic changes.

References

 , 1934: New Hesperiidae from Trinidad and Peru (Lepidoptera, Rhopalocera). American Museum Novitates 745: 1-6. Full article: .
 , 2001: Hesperiidae of Vietnam, 9. Three new species and one new subspecies from the subfamily Pyrginae (Lepidoptera: Hesperiidae). Atalanta 32 (3/4): 403-410.
  2003: Hesperiidae of Vietnam, 14: A new species of the genus Celaenorrhinus Hübner 1819 (Lepidoptera: Hesperiidae). Atalanta 34 (1/2): 115-118. Abstract: .
 , 2004, Atlas of Neotropical Lepidoptera; Checklist Part 4A; Hesperioidea-Papilionoidea
 , 2008, A new species of Celaenorrhinus (Lepidoptera, Hesperiidae) from N Myanmar, Trans. lepid. Soc. Japan 59 (3): 241-242. Abstract and full article: .
 , 1992 (1991): Notas sinonímicas sobre Hesperiidae Neotropicais, com descrições de novos géneros, espécies e subespécies (Lepidoptera). Revista Brasileira de Zoologia 7 (4): 503-524. Full article: .
 , 1971: Descriptions of new species and notes on other Hesperiidae of Africa. Bull. Allyn Museum 2: 1-17. Full article: 
 , 2008: Checklist of Afrotropical Papilionoidea and Hesperioidea.

External links
Seitz, A. Die Gross-Schmetterlinge der Erde 13: Die Afrikanischen Tagfalter. Plate XIII 76 et seq.
Images representing Potanthus  at Consortium for the Barcode of Life

 
Celaenorrhinini
Taxa named by Jacob Hübner
Hesperiidae genera